Eupithecia falkenbergi is a moth in the family Geometridae. It is found in Bhutan.

References

Moths described in 2011
falkenbergi
Moths of Asia